E. metallica may refer to:
 Epicyrtica metallica, a moth species found in Australia
 Eupanacra metallica, a moth species found from north-western India across Nepal, Bhutan, Bangladesh and northern Myanmar to south-western China

See also
 Metallica (disambiguation)